RDU may refer to:
Raleigh–Durham International Airport's IATA code
The Raleigh–Durham area
RDU-FM, a New Zealand radio station
Red Dot United, a political party in Singapore
WTKK, a radio station licensed at the time to Wilson, North Carolina, which called itself "106.1 RDU"